Zhang Zhen (born 5 September 1984 in Shenyang) is a Paralympian athlete from China competing mainly in category T11 middle-distance events.

He competed in the 2008 Summer Paralympics in Beijing, China.  There he won a gold medal in the men's 1500 metres - T11 event and a gold medal in the men's 5000 metres - T11 event.

External links
 

Paralympic athletes of China
Athletes (track and field) at the 2004 Summer Paralympics
Athletes (track and field) at the 2008 Summer Paralympics
Athletes (track and field) at the 2016 Summer Paralympics
Paralympic gold medalists for China
1984 births
Living people
Athletes from Shenyang
Chinese male middle-distance runners
Chinese male long-distance runners
Medalists at the 2008 Summer Paralympics
Paralympic medalists in athletics (track and field)
Visually impaired middle-distance runners
Visually impaired long-distance runners
Paralympic middle-distance runners
Paralympic long-distance runners
Medalists at the World Para Athletics Championships
Medalists at the 2010 Asian Para Games